The Godfathers are an English rock band from London, England, with strong influences from R&B and punk.

Career
The Godfathers were formed by Peter and Chris Coyne (vocals and bass, respectively) after the demise of The Sid Presley Experience in 1985, joined by Mike Gibson (guitar), Kris Dollimore (guitar) and George Mazur (drums). Peter Coyne had briefly worked as a music journalist from 1980–82 for ZigZag and Record Mirror. Fellow TSPE member, and later Godfather, Del Bartle, went on to form The Unholy Trinity with drummer Kevin Murphy.

After independent single releases produced by Vic Maile, and collected on their debut album, Hit by Hit, they signed to Epic Records in 1987. Extensive tours of the UK, Europe and the United States followed. Single and title track of their first album "Birth, School, Work, Death" made the U.S. Billboard Top 40 in 1988 after college radio and MTV airplay but the band were less commercially successful in the UK.

Albums More Songs About Love and Hate (1989) and Unreal World (1991) followed, with Chris Burrows replacing Kris Dollimore on guitar in time for the latter, after which the Godfathers left Epic and released a live album and two studio albums on German label Intercord in the early to mid-1990s. The band ceased activity in 2000. 

In 2003, Peter Coyne and Kris Dollimore played briefly in a band called the Germans with Rat Scabies, formerly of the Damned.

Reformation
In 2008, the band reformed with its original line-up. In March 2009, the band announced a change with Del Bartle returning to replace Kris Dollimore. Grant Nicholas later replaced George Mazur on drums, and Mike Gibson also left the band. In 2010, a live album, Shot Live at the 100 Club, was released as a CD/DVD set on Secret Records.

2011 saw the band release two download-only singles "Back Into the Future" and "The Outsider". "Primitive Man" followed the next year and all were included on their comeback album Jukebox Fury, released in 2013. Promotion for the album included a month-long UK tour supporting the Stranglers and drummer Dave Twigg stepping in for recently departed Grant Nicholas. 2014 saw another fresh line-up change, with two new guitarists, Mauro Venegas and Steve Crittall, replacing Del Bartle, and Tim James replacing (the recently returned) Grant Nicholas on drums. A new double-sided single, "Till My Heart Stops Beating" / "Rewind Time" was released in June 2015, and the band undertook several European and UK tours, also celebrating their 30th anniversary with a headline show at the 100 Club where they played 30 songs – one for each year – over the course of two sets.

In 2016, Chris Coyne left the band and was replaced by Darren Birch, formerly of Gunfire Dance, and touring bassist for both Walter Lure and Brian James (ex-the Damned). The new line-up recorded a new album, A Big Bad Beautiful Noise, in Birmingham that summer, which was released in February 2017, preceded by a single, "You Don't Love Me". Reviews hailed the album as the band's best in many years, with Vive Le Rock claiming it was "up there with the Godfathers' '80s classics".

During the A Big Bad Beautiful Noise 2017 tour through Europe, Mauro Venegas left the band and was replaced by guitarist Alex McBain.

In 2019, Peter Coyne announced he had parted ways with the previous Godfathers line-up, stating that he can "no longer work, tour or perform with Steve, Tim, Alex and Darren." With a new line-up consisting of bassist Jon Priestley, guitarists Richie Simpson and Wayne Vermaak, and drummer Billy Duncanson, the Godfathers released the double A-side single "I'm Not Your Slave"/"Wild and Free" on 17 June 2020, followed by the album Alpha Beta Gamma Delta in September 2022.

Discography

Studio albums
Hit by Hit (1986, Corporate Image) – UK Indie No. 3
Birth, School, Work, Death (1988, Epic) – UK No. 80
More Songs About Love and Hate (1989, Epic) - UK No. 49
Unreal World (1991, Epic)
The Godfathers (aka The Orange Album) (1993, Intercord)
Afterlife (1995, Intercord)
Jukebox Fury (2013, Godfathers Recordings)
A Big Bad Beautiful Noise (2017, Godfathers Recordings)
Alpha Beta Gamma Delta (2022, Godfathers Recordings)

Live albums
Dope, Rock 'n' Roll and Fucking in the Streets (1992, Corporate Image)
Shot Live at the 100 Club (2011, Secret Records Limited) – includes live DVD
This Is War! The Godfathers Live! (2019, Godfathers Recordings)

Compilation albums and reissues
Birth, School, Work, Death: The Best of the Godfathers (1996, Epic)
Birth, School, Work, Death: Hits, Rarities and Gems (2007, CMG)
Hit By Hit [2CD edition] (2008, Corporate Image)
Birth, School, Work, Death [expanded edition] (2011, Lemon Recordings)
More Songs About Love and Hate [expanded edition] (2011, Lemon Recordings)
The Godfathers (aka The Orange Album) [2CD edition] (2013, Godfathers Recordings)

Extended plays

Singles

Other appearances
"Cause I Said So" appeared on the soundtrack to the 1988 film Permanent Record. 
"It's So Hard" appeared on the 7" compilation Sounds – Waves 2, which was given away with Sounds magazine's March 1988 issue.

References

External links

Musical groups from London
English rock music groups
English alternative rock groups
Musical groups established in 1985
Epic Records artists